Alon Turgeman (born 9 June 1991) is an Israeli footballer who plays as a forward for Hapoel Haifa and the Israel national football team.

Early life
Turgeman was born in Hadera, Israel, to a family of Jewish descent.

Club career
He started to play football as a kid when he was part of Beitar Nes Tubruk. He represented Israel at the 2009 Maccabiah Games, winning a bronze medal.

In 2010, he moved to Hapoel Petah Tikva, and became a member of the senior side when he was 18 years old. In his only year with the senior team he made 30 caps, 8 goals and 2 assists and help the team to stay in the league.

On 7 August 2011 under the recommendation of Shlomo Scharf to the owner Ya'akov Shahar he signed with Israeli giants Maccabi Haifa. In his first season as a player of Maccabi Haifa Turgeman scored 7 goals and assist another 3 more in the first half of the season he came off the bench but in the second half of the season following the injury of Wiyam Amashe and the depart of Vladimir Dvalishvili he began to be in the starting 11.

in his second season with the team following the minority minutes that he received he considered to leave in January but after a call with manager Arik Benado he decided to stay and begin play more in the end of the season Turgeman scored 9 goals and assist another 3 more.

International career
Turgeman has played extensively for his nation at youth level from the under-19 side, to the under-21 side of which he took part in the 2013 UEFA European Under-21 Football Championship and scored one goal.

Club career statistics

Honours

Club
Bnei Yehuda
Israel State Cup: 2016–17

Hapoel Haifa
Israel State Cup: 2017–18

References

External links
 

1991 births
Living people
Competitors at the 2009 Maccabiah Games
Israeli Jews
Israeli footballers
Association football forwards
Beitar Nes Tubruk F.C. players
Hapoel Petah Tikva F.C. players
Maccabi Haifa F.C. players
Hapoel Tel Aviv F.C. players
Bnei Yehuda Tel Aviv F.C. players
Hapoel Haifa F.C. players
FK Austria Wien players
Wisła Kraków players
Israeli Premier League players
Israel youth international footballers
Israel under-21 international footballers
Israel international footballers
Footballers from Hadera
Expatriate footballers in Austria
Expatriate footballers in Poland
Israeli expatriate sportspeople in Austria
Israeli expatriate sportspeople in Poland
Maccabiah Games medalists in football
Maccabiah Games bronze medalists for Israel